Brenno may refer to:

Places
Brenno (river), a Swiss river
Brenno, Poland, a Polish town

People
Brenno Del Giudice (1888–1957), Italian rower and architect
Brenno Ambrosini (born 1967), Italian pianist
Brenno de Winter (born 1971), Dutch journalist
Brenno (footballer) (born 1999), Brazilian footballer

Other uses
Brennus, Enemy of Rome, a 1963 Italian film
Academia Ligustica do Brenno, an Italian society based on maintaining the Genoese language

See also
Brennus, Gaulish chieftains